Michael D. Hurley (born 1976) is Professor of Literature and Theology at the University of Cambridge, and a Fellow and Director of Studies in English at Trinity College, Cambridge. He was educated at the universities of Cambridge and St Andrews, and at Stonyhurst College. Hurley has published books and articles on literary form and style, and on the interrelations of literature, philosophy and theology. Concurrent with his academic position at Cambridge, he has been awarded visiting positions at Harvard and All Souls College, Oxford. Hurley is co-editor of The Hopkins Quarterly, a journal of critical, scholarly and appreciative responses to the lives and works of Gerard Manley Hopkins and his circle. He is also a Trustee of The Christian Heritage Centre, and frequently gives talks and public lectures on the philosophical and theological questions posed by art and literature.
In 2022, Hurley was profiled by the Catholic Herald as one of the “UK Catholic leaders of today”.

Publications 

 Thinking Through Style: Non-Fiction Prose of the Long Nineteenth Century (2018). Co-edited with Marcus Waithe. Oxford University Press. 
 Faith in Poetry: Verse Style as a Mode of Religious Belief (2017). Bloomsbury. 
 G. K. Chesterton (2012). Northcote House/British Council. 
 Poetic Form: An Introduction (2012). Co-authored with Michael O'Neill. Cambridge University Press. 
 The Complete Father Brown Stories (2012). Edited and Introduced. Penguin Classics.

References

Living people
1976 births
Academics of the University of Cambridge